Red Oak is a town in Nash County, North Carolina, United States. It is part of the Rocky Mount, North Carolina Metropolitan Statistical Area. The population was 3,430 in 2010.

History
Black Jack and the Red Oak Community House are listed on the National Register of Historic Places.

Geography

Demographics

2020 census

As of the 2020 United States census, there were 3,342 people, 1,433 households, and 1,133 families residing in the town.

2000 census
As of the census of 2000, there were 2,723 people, 984 households, and 821 families residing in the town. The population density was 139.7 people per square mile (53.9/km). There were 1,030 housing units at an average density of 52.8 per square mile (20.4/km). The racial makeup of the town was 90.67% White, 8.04% African American, 0.07% Native American, 0.26% Asian, 0.33% from other races, and 0.62% from two or more races. Hispanic or Latino of any race were 1.32% of the population.

There were 984 households, out of which 38.3% had children under the age of 18 living with them, 74.0% were married couples living together, 6.6% had a female householder with no husband present, and 16.5% were non-families. 14.6% of all households were made up of individuals, and 6.5% had someone living alone who was 65 years of age or older. The average household size was 2.77 and the average family size was 3.06.

In the town, the population was spread out, with 26.1% under the age of 18, 6.2% from 18 to 24, 28.8% from 25 to 44, 28.7% from 45 to 64, and 10.2% who were 65 years of age or older. The median age was 39 years. For every 100 females, there were 98.3 males. For every 100 females age 18 and over, there were 94.3 males.

The median income for a household in the town was $54,958, and the median income for a family was $61,406. Males had a median income of $40,718 versus $26,091 for females. The per capita income for the town was $22,616. About 5.7% of families and 6.7% of the population were below the poverty line, including 4.9% of those under age 18 and 16.6% of those age 65 or over.

References

Towns in Nash County, North Carolina
Towns in North Carolina
Rocky Mount metropolitan area